Dance Fever is an American variety game show hosted by Eric Nies. The three celebrity judges were Carmen Electra, Jamie King, and MC Hammer. The two-hour series premiere aired on ABC Family (now known as Freeform) on July 13, 2003.

In Canada, MuchMusic had the rights to air the series. Dance Fever also aired on Canada's Family Channel the same day as the ABC Family airings, becoming the only program on the channel to take commercial breaks during the show.

Three years later, tapdancing twins Sean and John became contestants on NBC's America's Got Talent. They did not make it to the finals, but were highly praised. Live in Color, a hip-hop booty-shaking dance crew from Florida, were the first and the only winner since the series did not continue.

References

External links
 

2000s American variety television series
Dance competition television shows
2000s American reality television series
2003 American television series debuts
2003 American television series endings
Television series by Merv Griffin Entertainment
Television series by 20th Century Fox Television
Television series created by Merv Griffin
English-language television shows
ABC Family original programming